Cory Walmsley is an American mixed martial arts fighter. He competes in the Light Heavyweight division. He lost his last fight at UFC 62 - Liddell vs Sobral against David Heath on August 26, 2006.



Mixed martial arts record

|-
| Loss
| align=center| 8-2
| David Heath
| Submission (rear naked choke)
| UFC 62: Liddell vs. Sobral
| 
| align=center| 1
| align=center| 2:32
| Nevada, United States
| 
|-
| Win
| align=center| 8-1
| Karl Knothe
| Submission (rear naked choke)
| UCS - Throwdown at the T-Bar
| 
| align=center| N/A
| 0
| Minnesota, United States
| 
|-
| Win
| align=center| 7-1
| Brandon Quigley
| Submission (rear naked choke)
| UCS 5 - Battle at the Barn
| 
| align=center| 1
| |
| Minnesota, United States
| 
|-
| Win
| align=center| 6-1
| Brandon Quigley
| Submission (armbar)
| UCS 4 - Ultimate Combat Sports 4
| 
| align=center| 1
| 
| Hagar, Wisconsin, United States
| 
|-
| Win
| align=center| 5-1
| Adam Parochka
| Submission (wrist lock)
| UCS 2 - Battle at the Barn
| 
| align=center| N/A
| |
| Minnesota, United States
| 
|-
| Win
| align=center| 4-1
| Roger Stiner
| Submission (strikes)
| IFA - Explosion
| 
| align=center| 1
| align=center| 0:26
| 
| 
|-
| Win
| align=center| 3-1
| DR Williams
| Decision
| IFA - Clash of the Champions
| 
| align=center| 3
| align=center| 3:00
| Minnesota, United States
| 
|-
| Win
| align=center| 2-1
| Bill Creel
| TKO
| MEF 2 - Minnesota Extreme Fight 2
| 
| align=center| N/A
| |
| Minnesota, United States
| 
|-
| Win
| align=center| 1-1
| Bill Creel
| Submission (choke)
| MCS 4 - Minnesota Combat Sports 4
| 
| align=center| N/A
| |
| Minnesota, United States
| 
|-
| Loss
| align=center| 0-1
| Chad Rockwite
| Decision
| MCS 3 - Minnesota Combat Sports 3
| 
| align=center| 3
| align=center| 5:00
| Minnesota, United States
|

References

External links

 

American male mixed martial artists
Light heavyweight mixed martial artists
Living people
Year of birth missing (living people)
Ultimate Fighting Championship male fighters